Shaun Bonétt (born 1 January 1971) is an Australian entrepreneur and property developer who founded and is CEO of Precision Group.

Early life 
Shaun Bonétt was born in London, England, to parents of Australian and Maltese descent, Marlene and Anton Bonétt, the latter of whom was an oncologist for the World Health Organization. Bonett moved to Australia in 1978 and studied at Saint Ignatius College, in Adelaide. In the 1980s, Bonétt worked as a law clerk in Adelaide, and studied at the University of Adelaide, graduating in 1991 with a Bachelor of Laws and Arts. Bonétt is also a graduate of the University of South Australia.

Career 
Bonétt worked for the law firm Thomson Simmons & Co from 1990 to 1996 and then as a Senior Associate at Phillips Fox Lawyers from 1996 to 1998.

In 1994 when he was 24 years old, Bonétt founded Precision Group, a property investment and management company, and was involved in the re-positioning of MacArthur Central, and collaborated with the Bank of China to purchase the Chevron Renaissance Shopping Centre. Bonétt also negotiated the establishment of a Tiffany & Company outlet in Adelaide Central Plaza, along with three other international retailers, including David Jones.

In 2003 Bonétt joined the board of directors of iSelect Health & Life Insurance, in 2005 he joined the board of Lenders Direct, and in 2007 he joined the board and became Chairman of Litigation Lending Services. In 2018  Bonétt acquired a material stake and board seat in the data analytics ASX listed company Skyfii Limited.

In May 2006, Bonétt negotiated one of the largest property swap transactions in Australian history, when he swapped Precision Group's property at 160 Ann Street, Brisbane for MacArthur Central in Brisbane, in a $186 million swap transaction.

In 2010 Bonétt's Precision Group was the first private Australian businesses to undertake various finance transactions with the Bank of China and Bonétt subsequently made submissions to the Foreign Investment Review Board ("FIRB") to enable more Australian businesses to access loans from International banks without having to first obtain FIRB approval. In 2015 Bonétt also actively supported and made representations to Government for Australia's free trade agreement with China.

In 2022, the University of South Australia conferred to Bonétt an honorary doctorate.

Personal life 
In 2004, Bonétt married model, Vanessa Baron. , they have a daughter, Eve, and a son, Gabriel.

Net worth 
Bonétt debuted on the Business Review Weekly (BRW) Young Rich List in 2006 placing third with a net worth of 220 million and was ranked as Australia's Richest Person 40 and Under in 2007–2008. Bonétt's net worth, as of 2018, was estimated by The Australian Financial Review to be 718 million, a number that climbed from 478 million in 2015. In 2019 Bonett's net worth was estimated by The Australian to be 1.17 billion (79th rank).

References

External links 
Shaun Bonétt - Precision Group

1971 births
University of Adelaide alumni
University of South Australia alumni
Australian businesspeople
Living people
Australian billionaires
Australian people of Maltese descent
English people of Australian descent
English people of Maltese descent
People from London
Knights of Malta